Bryocyclops  is a genus of freshwater-dwelling cyclopoid copepods. The epithet Bryo- for Bryophyta (Mosses) refers to the fact that the first few species were described from mosses.

Distribution 
Species belonging to this genus are distributed in all major biogeographic realms except Antarctica, although there are only a handful of species from the Nearctic (B. muscicola) and Neotropical realm (B. campaneri and B. rochi). Researchers suspect that with increasing sampling efforts, more species will be discovered from these regions. Apart from continental habitats, some species occur on the oceanic islands of Guam, Fiji, Tonga, Samoa and Christmas Island. In recent years, five new species have been described from caves in Thailand.

Habitat 
As its name suggests, the type species was found in damp mosses. Apart from other microcrustaceans  such as cladocerans, ostracods and harpacticoid copepods, only a few genera of cyclopoid copepods have managed to access semiterrestrial habitats like mosses, leaf litter, tree holes, leaf axils, bromeliads and other phytotelmata, or even man-made microhabitats (water-filled tin cans, car tires). These habitats pose serious challenges to fully aquatic organisms, especially since they rely on passive means of dispersal (phoresis). Species of the genus Bryocyclops also inhabit cave pools, groundwater and other freshwater bodies.

Species 
This genus currently contains 26 valid species:

 Bryocyclops (Palaeocyclops) jankowskajae Monchenko, 1972
 Bryocyclops absalomi Por, 1981
 Bryocyclops africanus Kiefer, 1932
 Bryocyclops ankaratranus Kiefer, 1954
 Bryocyclops anninae (Menzel, 1926)
 Bryocyclops apertus Kiefer, 1935
 Bryocyclops asetus Watiroyram, 2018
 Bryocyclops bogoriensis (Menzel, 1926)
 Bryocyclops campaneri Rocha & Bjornberg, 1987
 Bryocyclops caroli Bjornberg, 1985
 Bryocyclops chappuisi Kiefer, 1928
 Bryocyclops constrictus Lindberg, 1950
 Bryocyclops correctus Kiefer, 1960
 Bryocyclops difficilis Kiefer, 1935
 Bryocyclops elachistus Kiefer, 1935
 Bryocyclops fidjiensis Lindberg, 1954
 Bryocyclops jankowskajae Monchenko, 1972
 Bryocyclops maewaensis Watiroyram, Brancelj & Sanoamuang, 2012
 Bryocyclops maholarnensis Watiroyram, Brancelj & Sanoamuang, 2015
 Bryocyclops mandrakanus Kiefer, 1954
 Bryocyclops muscicola (Menzel, 1926)
 Bryocyclops muscicoloides Watiroyram, 2018
 Bryocyclops parvulus Kiefer, 1928
 Bryocyclops phyllopus Kiefer, 1935
 Bryocyclops trangensis Watiroyram, 2018
 Bryocyclops travancoricus Lindberg, 1947

Gallery

References 

Cyclopidae
Cyclopoida genera